Rhode Island elected its members August 30, 1827, after the term began but before the new Congress convened.

See also 
 1826 and 1827 United States House of Representatives elections
 List of United States representatives from Rhode Island

1827
Rhode Island
United States House of Representatives